Terramatta: The Italian Twentieth Century of Vincenzo Rabito Sicilian illiterate is a 2012 documentary directed by Costanza Quatriglio, based on the memoir Terra Matta by Vincenzo Rabito. Winner of several awards, including the Nastro d'Argento 2013, it was shown in all major Italian cities.

Plot 

The film is centered around narration of excerpts from Vincenzo Rabito's memoir, Terra Matta. Rabito begins with his background in Sicily. He was born in 1899, and at a young age, he was pulled out of school to earn a wage for his family after the death of his father. As a teenager, he was drafted to fight in World War I. In some excerpts, he relates some of the atrocities he committed during the war, including assisting a friend in sexually torturing a young Italian woman. Following the war, Rabito worked in German mines until the beginning of World War II.

At the insistence of his mother, Rabito took a wife, with whom he had three children. The children are shown as fully grown men in present-day Italy, visiting their father's childhood home and relating their own memories of some events Rabito wrote about. Despite remaining distanced from his wife, Rabito took great pride in his children, particularly because they were all fully educated and literate. Rabito did not learn to write until he was an adult; the spelling in his memoir is largely based on phonetic transliterations of Sicilian language.

Although Rabito is telling his own story, he is scarcely shown in the film. Instead, his narration generally underscores footage of war, images of Sicilian villages and countrysides, and images of his journals.

Production 
Terramatta is narrated by Roberto Nobile, reading selections from the memoirs of Vincenzo Rabito. Rabito's three sons, Turi, Tano, and Giovanni also appear in the film.

Images in the film are taken from the Cinecittà Luce and other private archives, along with more recent footage of Chiaramonte Gulfi (provided by Rabito's three sons) and surrounding Sicilian countryside. Original pages from Rabito's diary, preserved in the National Diary Archive of Pieve Santo Stefano appear in the film.

Release
The film premiered at the Venice Film Festival on 6 September 2012.

References

External links 

  
 
  Sheet of the film on Giornate degli autori 2012 - Venice Days
  Sheet at Rete degli Spettatori and interview with the director.

Italian documentary films
2012 films
Documentary films about Sicily